Thyatira hedemanni is a moth in the family Drepanidae. It was described by Hugo Theodor Christoph in 1885. It is found in Georgia, Turkey, Armenia, Iran and Azerbaijan.

References

Moths described in 1885
Thyatirinae